The Château de Rochetaillée is a ruined feudal castle in the city of Saint-Étienne in the Loire département of France.

The castle's construction dates from the 12th century, with additional work in the 16th century.

It has been listed since 1930 as a monument historique by the French Ministry of Culture.

See also
List of castles in France

References

External links
 

Ruined castles in Auvergne-Rhône-Alpes
Monuments historiques of Loire (department)